The Ocean City Police Department (OCPD) is a full-time-service law enforcement agency providing police services to a population of 7,031 people within  of the municipality of Ocean City, MD.

History
The OCPD began its tenure in the summer of 1898 with the appointment of a single officer, Cyrus Purnell. In 1900, the mayor and town council approved the expansion of the department to include two more officers and the appointment of Purnell to the position of chief of police. Because of its summertime population swell, the OCPD historically has hired summertime police to supplement its full-time force. In 1965, with the professionalization of the department, the town's officers were attending an officially sanctioned "police academy." This "academy" had officers attending formal classes twice weekly for three weeks which totaled 18 hours of instruction. In contrast, today's police recruits attend the Eastern Shore Criminal Justice Academy for 24 weeks with a total of over 800 hours of instruction.

Equipment 
Full time officers employed with the Ocean City Police Department carry the SIG Sauer P226 chambered in .40 S&W. Seasonal Officers carry a S&W Model 65 in .357 magnum.

Organization
The current chief of police is Ross Buzzuro. Apart from traditional duties of 9-1-1 response and traffic enforcement, the OCPD has other specialized units:
 Quick Response Team (SWAT)
 Traffic Safety Unit
 Bike Unit
 K-9 Unit
 Mounted Unit

See also

 List of law enforcement agencies in Maryland

References

External links
Ocean City Police Department official website

1898 establishments in Maryland
Worcester County, Maryland
Municipal police departments of Maryland
Government agencies established in 1898
Ocean City, Maryland